A salamander (or deadman's foot or furnace bear) in the metallurgy dialect means all liquid and solidified
materials in the hearth of a blast furnace below the tap hole.

The target of the salamander tapping is to remove the remaining hot metal and slag from the blast furnace to allow a safe and efficient intermediate repair and blow-in of the blast furnace.

During blowing down of the furnace the salamander is tapped by drilling a hole in the blast furnace hearth.

Metallurgical processes
Steelmaking